"" (To sing on the water), D. 774, is a Lied composed by Franz Schubert in 1823, based on the poem of the same name by Friedrich Leopold zu Stolberg-Stolberg.

The text describes a scene on the water from the perspective of the narrator who is in a boat, and delves into the narrator's reflections on the passing of time. The song's piano accompaniment recreates the texture of the shimmering waves mentioned in the third line of the poem and its rhythmic style in the 6/8 meter is reminiscent of a barcarole. Harmonically, the song as a whole and within each stanza traces a movement from the minor mode to the major mode: the song begins in A-flat minor and ends in A-flat major.

Franz Liszt transcribed the piece for solo piano, S. 558.

Text 
Mitten im Schimmer der spiegelnden Wellen
Gleitet, wie Schwäne, der wankende Kahn;
Ach, auf der Freude sanftschimmernden Wellen
Gleitet die Seele dahin wie der Kahn;
Denn von dem Himmel herab auf die Wellen
Tanzet das Abendrot rund um den Kahn.

Über den Wipfeln des westlichen Haines
Winket uns freundlich der rötliche Schein;
Unter den Zweigen des östlichen Haines
Säuselt der Kalmus im rötlichen Schein;
Freude des Himmels und Ruhe des Haines
Atmet die Seel' im errötenden Schein.

Ach, es entschwindet mit tauigem Flügel
Mir auf den wiegenden Wellen die Zeit.
Morgen entschwindet mit schimmerndem Flügel
Wieder wie gestern und heute die Zeit,
Bis ich auf höherem, strahlenden Flügel
Selber entschwinde der wechselnden Zeit.
In the midst of the shimmering, mirroring waves
Glides like swans the rocking boat
Ah, on softly shimmering waves of joy
Glides the soul away like the boat.
For from the heavens down on the waves
Dances the evening glow round about the boat.

Above the treetops of the western glade
Beckons to us amiably the ruddy glow;
Under the branches of the eastern glade
Rustle the reeds in the ruddy glow.
Joy of the heavens and peace of the glades
Breathes the soul in the reddening glow.

Ah, with dewy wings
On the rocking waves, time escapes from me
Tomorrow with shimmering wings
Like yesterday and today may time again escape from me,
Until I on towering, radiant wings
Myself escape from changing time.

References

Further reading

External links

, Barbara Bonney, Geoffrey Parsons

Lieder composed by Franz Schubert
1823 songs
Compositions in A-flat minor